Ibl al-Saqi (إبل السقي) is a town in the Marjeyoun District in southern Lebanon.

History
In 1875, Victor Guérin found it to be a "considerable" village, with about 1000 inhabitants. 700 were  "Schismatic Greek" and the rest were apparently Druze. At the north-west of the village there was an abundant stream.

Following the establishment of UNIFIL Ibl al-Saqi was in the eastern most sector in which the UN had soldiers with the Norwegian Army establishing their base near the village. In 1999 they were replaced by an Indian battalion from the 4th Gurkha Rifles. On 2 March 1999 the IDF South Lebanon coordinator, Brigadier General Erez Gerstein was killed by a roadside bomb on the road between Ibl al-Saqi and Kaukaba.  The two soldiers and a reporter he was travelling with were also killed.

In June 1999, as the South Lebanon Army (SLA) withdrew from Jezzine, retreating SLA members and their families commandeered empty houses in Ibl al-Saqi, Kawkaba and Marjayun. At the time it was estimated that the SLA had only four hundred men.

Sister cities
 Kongsvinger, Norway

References

Bibliography

External links
Ibl Es Saqi, Localiban

Populated places in the Israeli security zone 1985–2000
Populated places in Marjeyoun District